The Battle of Iguará was a battle of the Cuban War of Independence which took place on December 13, 1895 in the Santa Clara Province, Cuba.

The Battle
That same day, near the town of Iguará , the Invasive Column, under the command of Major Generals Máximo Gómez and Antonio Maceo, faced a Spanish column, under the command of Colonel Segura.

The invaders forded the Jatibonico River to enter Las Villas and when only half had crossed the river, they detected the Spanish troops. Gómez occupied a near height to beat the advancing opponent. For his part, Maceo went to the river in order to prevent the column from splitting into two parts.

When the Spanish troops saw the Cubans, they opened heavy fire on them. They organized in two oblique lines and at the same time, attacked the forces of both Mambi generals.

Maceo decided to charge his cavalry and despite the intense fire, it didn't prevent the annihilation of several sections of the Spanish troops, whose forces were disorganized. Gómez attacked from the other flank and the Mambisa rear, which had just finished fording the river, also charged, which put an end to the resistance of the Spaniards, who undertook the withdrawal.

The Cubans collected abandoned weapons and equipment and attacked again. After two hours of action, Gómez and Maceo put an end to the fight. Both forces suffered heavy losses: The Cubans lost 30 horsemen, including Lieutenant Colonel Enrique Céspedes , and the Spanish left 18 of their own lying on the battlefield. The Cubans captured 54 rifles and several mules loaded with various means.

Aftermath
The victory of the battle resulted in the imminent advance of the Cuban forces in the invasion, as well as the achievement of important military victories, the incorporation of a large number of combatants into the Mambi ranks and the obtaining of new weapons and ammunition.

References

Bibliography
General Municipal Museum of Jatibonico.
Municipal Library of Jatibonico " Elcires Pérez González "
Association of Combatants of the Cuban Revolution (ACRC) (Jatibonico).
CEMI Authors Collective (2014): Encyclopedic Dictionary of Cuban Military History; "First part (1510-1898)", volume II: Combative actions (page 154). Havana: Verde Olivo Editions , 2014.

Conflicts in 1895
Battles involving Spain
Spanish colonial period of Cuba
December 1895 events
Battles involving Cuba